Scarborough General Hospital is a hospital in the City of Scarborough, Trinidad and Tobago. It is the only hospital for the entire Island of Tobago.

This Institution falls under the Tobago Regional Health Authority (TRHA).

References 

Hospitals in Trinidad and Tobago
Tobago
Hospitals established in 2012
2012 establishments in Trinidad and Tobago